S. Amir Ali Jinnah (also known as A. A. Jinnah) is an Indian politician who served as Member of Rajya Sabha.

Personal life 
He was born in 1941. His father S Mohammed Sulaiman was a farmer.

References 

Rajya Sabha members from Tamil Nadu
1941 births
Date of birth missing (living people)
Living people
Place of birth missing (living people)
21st-century Indian politicians